The shinyrayed pocketbook (Hamiota subangulata) is a federally endangered species of freshwater mussel, an aquatic bivalve mollusk in the family Unionidae, the river mussels. This species is endemic to the United States in the states of Georgia, Florida, and Alabama .

The shinyrayed pocketbook's shell is solid yet thin with a smooth and shiny surface. The coloring is light yellowish brown with fairly wide, bright emerald green rays over the entire length of the shell which may appear as darker brown in older specimens. Water and food are obtained by siphoning which provides phytoplankton, tiny zooplankton, and organic detritus.

References

Shinyrayed pocketbook taxonomy
 Beacham, Walton, Beacham's Guide to the Endangered Species of North America, Beacham Publishing Corporation (December 2000)

Molluscs of the United States
Unionidae
Bivalves described in 1840
ESA endangered species